

"Broadwell-DE" (14 nm) 
 All models support: MMX, SSE, SSE2, SSE3, SSSE3, SSE4.1, SSE4.2, AVX, F16C, Enhanced Intel SpeedStep Technology (EIST), Intel 64, XD bit (an NX bit implementation), TXT, Intel VT-x, Intel EPT, Intel VT-d, Hyper-threading, Turbo Boost (except D-1518, D-1529), AES-NI, Smart Cache, ECC memory.
 SoC peripherals include 8× USB (4× 2.0, 4× 3.0), 6× SATA, 2× Integrated 10 GbE LAN, UART, GPIO, and 32 lanes of PCI Express (8× 2.0, 24× 3.0), in ×16, ×8 and ×4 configurations.
 Support for up to four DIMMs of DDR4 or DDR3L memory per CPU socket.

Xeon D-15xx (uniprocessor, SoC)

"Hewitt Lake" (14 nm)

Xeon D-16xx (uniprocessor, SoC)

"Broadwell-H" (14 nm) 
 All models support: MMX, SSE, SSE2, SSE3, SSSE3, SSE4.1, SSE4.2, AVX, F16C, Enhanced Intel SpeedStep Technology (EIST), Intel 64, XD bit (an NX bit implementation), TXT, Intel VT-x, Intel EPT, Intel VT-d, Hyper-threading, Turbo Boost, AES-NI, Smart Cache, ECC memory.
 Support for up to four DIMMs of DDR3L memory per CPU socket.

Xeon E3-12xx v4 (uniprocessor)

"Broadwell-EP" (14 nm) 
 All models support: MMX, SSE, SSE2, SSE3, SSSE3, SSE4.1, SSE4.2, AVX, AVX2, FMA3, F16C, Enhanced Intel SpeedStep Technology (EIST), Intel 64, XD bit (an NX bit implementation), Intel VT-x, Intel VT-d, Hyper-threading (except E5-2603v4, 2609v4 and 4627v4), Turbo Boost 2.0 (except E5-1603v4, 1607v4, 2603v4, 2609v4 and 4610v4), AES-NI, Smart Cache.
 Transistors: Up to 10 cores: 3.20 billion, Up to 15 cores: 4.70 billion, Up to 24 cores: 7.20 billion
 Die size: Up to 10 cores: 246 mm2, Up to 15 cores: 306 mm2, Up to 24 cores: 456 mm2
 Support for up to twelve DIMMs of DDR4 memory per CPU socket.

Xeon E5-16xx v4 (uniprocessor)

Xeon E5-26xx v4 (dual-processor)

Xeon E5-46xx v4 (quad-processor)

"Broadwell-EX" (14 nm) 
 All models support: MMX, SSE, SSE2, SSE3, SSSE3, SSE4.1, SSE4.2, AVX, AVX2, FMA3, F16C, Enhanced Intel SpeedStep Technology (EIST), Intel 64, XD bit (an NX bit implementation), Intel VT-x, Intel VT-d, Hyper-threading, Turbo Boost 2.0, AES-NI, Smart Cache.
 Support for up to 12 DIMMs of DDR4 memory per CPU socket.

Xeon E7-48xx v4 (quad-processor)

Xeon E7-88xx v4 (octa-processor)

References 

Intel Xeon (Broadwell)